Sara Errani and Roberta Vinci were the defending champions but lost in the final to Nuria Llagostera Vives and Arantxa Parra Santonja, 3–6, 6–4, [10–5].

Seeds

Draw

Draw

External links
 Main Draw

Doubles